The City Junior A Football Championship (known for sponsorship reasons as the EBO Home Rescue City Junior A Football Championship) is an annual Gaelic football competition organised by the Seandún Board of the Gaelic Athletic Association since 1926 for junior Gaelic football teams in Cork, Ireland.

The series of games begin in May, with the championship culminating with the final in the autumn. The championship has always been run as a knock-out competition with no second chance for beaten teams.

The City Junior Championship is an integral part of the wider Cork Junior Football Championship. The winners and runners-up of the City Championship join their counterparts from the other seven divisions to contest the county championship.

10 clubs currently participate in the City Championship. 

St Michael's are the title-holders after defeating Brian Dillons by 2-11 to 1-11 in the 2022 championship final.

Teams

2023 Teams

Roll of honour

List of finals

Records

Gaps

Top ten longest gaps between successive championship titles:
 39 years: Brian Dillons (1938-1977)
 38 years: Delaney Rovers (1977-2015)
 31 years: St Michael's (1956-1987)
 31 years: Na Piarsaigh (1974-2005)
 31 years: Douglas (1973-2004)
 27 years: St. Finbarr's (1961-1988)
 26 years  Passage (1994-2020) (The suffering ends)
 23 years: St. Finbarr's (1988-2011)
 22 years: Delaney Rovers (1955-1977)
 22 years: Mayfield (1975-1997)
 21 years: Bishopstown (1971-1992)

External link

 Seandún GAA website

City Junior A Football Championship